is a Japanese actor and former comedian. He has appeared in more than 100 films since 1981.

Selected filmography

Film

Television

References

External links
 Official profile 
 

1950 births
Living people
Japanese male film actors
Japanese male television actors
People from Chikushino, Fukuoka
Actors from Fukuoka Prefecture
20th-century Japanese male actors
21st-century Japanese male actors